Thomas Whitefield Bentley (July 5, 1884 – June 12, 1952) was a life insurance company manager and political figure on Prince Edward Island. He represented 4th Prince in the Legislative Assembly of Prince Edward Island from 1924 to 1927 as a Conservative.

He was the son of George Bentley and Emma Jane Dennis. Bentley married Linda Irene Moore. He lived in Kensington. He was a branch manager for the Maritime Life Assurance Company; after he retired in 1952, he was rehired by the company as provincial supervisor. He died at the Prince Edward Island Hospital in Charlottetown at the age of 67.

References 
 

People from Prince County, Prince Edward Island
Progressive Conservative Party of Prince Edward Island MLAs
1884 births
1952 deaths